Cymindis dostojewskii is a species of ground beetle in the subfamily Harpalinae. It was described by Tschitscherine in 1896.

References

dostojewskii
Beetles described in 1896